Cedar Creek is an  unincorporated community in Bastrop County, Texas, United States, located 11 miles (18 km) west of Bastrop at the intersection of State Highway 21 and Farm to Market Road 535. Cedar Creek has a post office with a ZIP code 78612. The community takes its name from Cedar Creek, a tributary of the Colorado River.

The 405-acre Hyatt Regency Lost Pines Resort is located in Cedar Creek.

Education

Students in the Cedar Creek area attend Cedar Creek Elementary School, Cedar Creek Intermediate School, Cedar Creek Middle school, and Cedar Creek High School. All Cedar Creek schools are within the Bastrop Independent School District.

Parks
Cedar Creek County Park was dedicated in 2008. The 46 acre park is Bastrop County's first county park. The park features fields for football, soccer, and baseball, courts for basketball and sand volleyball, a playscape, nature trails, historic sites, picnic tables and a butterfly garden.

Climate
Climate is characterized by relatively high temperatures and evenly distributed precipitation throughout the year.  The Köppen Climate Classification subtype for this climate is "Cfa" (Humid Subtropical Climate).

History
In 1832, Addison and Mary Owen Litton and others settled the area around where the Old San Antonio Road crossed Cedar Creek. A road from Austin to the Gulf of Mexico was laid out through Bastrop County near Cedar Creek in 1837. In 1842, the Methodist church became an important part of the community.  Other churches followed, including a Presbyterian church in 1855. The first school was established in 1849. In 1852, a post office opened.  In the 1883, a teacher-training school opened.  By the late 1880s, the population dropped to 250.  From the 1910s through the 1940s, oil played a part of the local economy and the population reached 300.  In 2000, the population was 200.

References

Unincorporated communities in Bastrop County, Texas
Unincorporated communities in Texas